The Royal Dutch Athletics Federation (Dutch: Koninklijke Nederlandse Atletiek Unie or Atletiekunie) is the governing body for the sport of athletics in the Netherlands.

Affiliations 
 World Athletics (WA)
 European Athletic Association (EAA)
 Dutch Olympic Committee

National records 
KNAU maintains the Dutch records in athletics.

References

External links 
 

Netherlands
Sports governing bodies in the Netherlands
National governing bodies for athletics